Fields of Honor is a 1918 five-part film adapted from a story by Irvin S. Cobb. Ralph Ince directed. Advertising for the film described it as a dramatic portrayal of what women are sacrificing to the world war. It was produced by Samuel Goldwyn. It is not held at the Library of Congress.

Cast
Mae Marsh
Vernon Steele
Marguerite Marsh
George Cooper
John Wessel
Nell Moran
Maud Cooling
Ned Hay
Edward Lynch

References

1918 films
Samuel Goldwyn Productions films
American war films
Films directed by Ralph Ince
1910s American films